Audio Stream Input/Output (ASIO) is a computer sound card driver protocol for digital audio specified by Steinberg, providing a low-latency and high fidelity interface between a software application and a computer's sound card. Whereas Microsoft's DirectSound is commonly used as an intermediary signal path for non-professional users, ASIO allows musicians and sound engineers to access external hardware directly.

Overview
ASIO bypasses the normal audio path from a user application through layers of intermediary Windows operating system software so that an application connects directly to the sound card hardware. Each layer that is bypassed means a reduction in latency (the delay between an application sending audio information and it being reproduced by the sound card, or input signals from the sound card being available to the application). In this way, ASIO offers a relatively simple way of accessing multiple audio inputs and outputs independently.

Operating systems
Interface support is normally restricted to Microsoft Windows. Starting with Windows Vista, KMixer has been removed and replaced by WASAPI and a new WaveRT port driver.

There is also an experimental ASIO driver for Wine, WineASIO, for  a Windows compatibility layer for Linux. WineASIO driver uses the JACK sound server as its audio back-end and allows many ASIO-aware applications to run with low latency under WINE.

Other free or open source alternatives are ASIO4All, FlexASIO, ASIO2KS, and ASIO2WASAPI.

Being a proprietary protocol, it does not have any universal compatibility with Windows-based DAW and other recording software. For example, the user manual of the Audacity audio editor states: "Licensing restrictions prevent us including ASIO support in released versions of Audacity, but Audacity can be compiled with ASIO support for private, non-distributable use."

See also
 JUCE, an open-source C++ toolkit that includes support for ASIO audio devices.
 JACK Audio Connection Kit, a similar system primarily for Linux.

References

External links
 Steinberg website

Application programming interfaces
Audio libraries
Digital audio